Muhammad Ulinnuha (born 5 September 1991, in Solo) is a male Indonesian badminton player. He is a doubles specialist.

Achievements

BWF World Junior Championships 
Boys' doubles

BWF International Challenges/Series (6 titles, 2 runners-up) 
Men's doubles

Mixed doubles

 BWF International Challenge tournament
 BWF International Series tournament
 BWF Future Series tournament

BWF Junior International (3 titles, 1 runner-up) 

Boys' doubles

Mixed doubles

  BWF Junior International Grand Prix tournament
  BWF Junior International Challenge tournament
  BWF Junior International Series tournament
  BWF Junior Future Series tournament

References

1991 births
Living people
Indonesian male badminton players
Sportspeople from Central Java
People from Surakarta